Anchaing (or Enchaing) was a legendary maroon from Réunion. Many versions of the legend exist.

Allusions
The summit of a mountain in Salazie is named the Piton of Anchaing after the legend.
 recounted the legend of Anchaing in a poem in his collection Salazienne.

References

Sources
 Graham M.S. Dann, "The Tourist as a Metaphor of the Social World", (2002, CABI; First edition)

Legendary people from Réunion
People of African descent from Réunion
Slaves from Réunion
Maroons (people)